Elizabeth "Bessie" Scott, Countess of Eldon (c.1754 – 28 June 1831), formerly Elizabeth "Bessie" Surtees, was the wife of John Scott, 1st Earl of Eldon.

She was the daughter of Aubone Surtees, a banker of Newcastle upon Tyne, and his wife, formerly Elizabeth Stephenson, and was baptised at St Nicholas, Newcastle upon Tyne, on 26 November 1754. She married John Scott in Blackshiels, Scotland, on 19 November 1772. The marriage was officially blessed two months later at St Nicholas, Newcastle upon Tyne. The couple had eloped when the earl, who was from a relatively poor Newcastle family, was training to be a clergyman. His occupation as a curate was inadequate to keep a wife and he trained instead as a lawyer. His success both in law and business was such that by the 1790s he was wealthy enough to buy the Eldon estate near Sedgefield, but the couple did not live there. 

The couple had three, or possibly four, children:

Lady Elizabeth Scott (c.1790-1862), who married George Stanley Repton, son of the landscape gardener Humphry Repton, and had children
Lady Frances Jane Scott (died 1838), who married the Reverend Edward Bankes and had children
Hon. John Scott, MP (1774-1805), who married Henrietta Elizabeth Ridley and had one child, John, who succeeded his grandfather as Earl of Eldon
Hon. William Henry John Scott, MP (c.1794-1832)

See also
Bessie Surtees House

References

1750s births
1831 deaths
British countesses
Scott family (England)